The following is an alphabetical list of topics related to the Eastern Republic of Uruguay.

0–9

.uy – Internet country code top-level domain for Uruguay

A
Americas
South America
Islands of Uruguay
South Atlantic Ocean
Rio de la Plata
Atlantic Ocean
Atlas of Uruguay

C
Cannabis in Uruguay
Capital of Uruguay:  Montevideo
Categories:
:Category:Uruguay
:Category:Buildings and structures in Uruguay
:Category:Communications in Uruguay
:Category:Economy of Uruguay
:Category:Education in Uruguay
:Category:Environment of Uruguay
:Category:Geography of Uruguay
:Category:Government of Uruguay

:Category:Health in Uruguay and universal healthcare
:Category:History of Uruguay
:Category:Law of Uruguay
:Category:Military of Uruguay
:Category:Politics of Uruguay
:Category:Science and technology in Uruguay
:Category:Society of Uruguay
:Category:Sport in Uruguay
:Category:Transport in Uruguay
:Category:Uruguay stubs
:Category:Uruguayan awards
:Category:Uruguayan culture
:Category:Uruguayan people
:Category:Uruguay-related lists
commons:Category:Uruguay
Coat of arms of Uruguay
Communications in Uruguay
Currency of Uruguay

D
Demographics of Uruguay

E
Eastern Republic of Uruguay (República Oriental del Uruguay)
Economy of Uruguay
Electricity sector in Uruguay

F

Flag of Uruguay
Foreign relations of Uruguay

G
Geography of Uruguay
Geology of Uruguay
Guaraní Aquifer

H
"Himno Nacional"
History of Uruguay

I
International Organization for Standardization (ISO)
ISO 3166-1 alpha-2 country code for Uruguay: UY
ISO 3166-1 alpha-3 country code for Uruguay: URY
ISO 3166-2:UY region codes for Uruguay
Islands of Uruguay

J
 Japanese Uruguayan

L
Latin America
Lists related to Uruguay:
Diplomatic missions of Uruguay
List of cities in Uruguay
List of diplomatic missions in Uruguay
List of islands of Uruguay
List of Ministers for Public Health (Uruguay)
List of Ministers of Economics and Finance (Uruguay)
List of Ministers of Education and Culture (Uruguay)
List of Ministers of Livestock, Agriculture, and Fisheries (Uruguay)
List of Ministers of the Interior (Uruguay)
List of Ministers of Transport and Public Works (Uruguay)
List of Ministers of Labour and Social Security (Uruguay)
List of Uruguay-related topics
Topic outline of Uruguay

M
Military of Uruguay
Montevideo – Capital of Uruguay

N
National anthem of Uruguay
National System of Protected Areas
Nuclear energy in Uruguay

O
 Orders, decorations, and medals

P
Politics of Uruguay
Postage stamps and postal history of Uruguay

R
República Oriental del Uruguay (Eastern Republic of Uruguay)
Revenue stamps of Uruguay
Rio de la Plata

S
Scouting in Uruguay
Spanish colonization of the Americas
Spanish language

T
Topic outline of Uruguay
Transport in Uruguay

U
United Nations founding member state 1945
Uruguay

W
Water supply and sanitation in Uruguay

Wikipedia:WikiProject Topic outline/Drafts/Topic outline of Uruguay

See also

List of international rankings
Lists of country-related topics
Topic outline of geography
Topic outline of South America
Topic outline of Uruguay
United Nations

External links

 
Uruguay